Rachel Genevieve Nolan (born 1974) is a former Australian politician. She was elected as the state member for Ipswich on 17 February 2001.  At the time she was Queensland's youngest ever female MP. She held the seat until 26 March 2012.

Nolan was educated at the Ipswich Girls' Grammar School, in Ipswich, Queensland. Prior to entering Parliament she worked as a political adviser to the Northern Territory's then Leader of the Opposition and the Queensland Labor Government.

In October 2006 Nolan was recognised as the University of Queensland's Young Alumnus of the Year.

Anna Bligh appointed Nolan Parliamentary Secretary to the Minister for Communities, Disability Services, Aboriginal and Torres Strait Island Partnerships, Multicultural Affairs, Seniors and Youth (Lindy Nelson-Carr) in her first Ministry. Following the March 2009 state election, she was promoted to Minister for Transport. Then, in the February 2011 reshuffle, she was given the new post of Minister of Finance and received Bligh's Arts portfolio as well. When Kate Jones resigned from Cabinet to concentrate on defending her seat of Ashgrove against LNP leader Campbell Newman, Nolan was assigned the additional brief of National Resources.

Nolan was defeated in the 2012 Queensland Government election by liberal candidate for Ipswich, Ian Berry.

References

Members of the Queensland Legislative Assembly
Living people
1974 births
People from Ipswich, Queensland
Australian Labor Party members of the Parliament of Queensland
21st-century Australian politicians
21st-century Australian women politicians
Women members of the Queensland Legislative Assembly